House of Carters is an American reality show on E! in the United States & MuchMusic in Canada, about the lives of Backstreet Boy Nick Carter and his four siblings reuniting in Los Angeles (while Carter was gearing up for the Backstreet Boys 6th studio album Unbreakable) as they try to revive their careers as well as reconnect as a family. The series premiered on October 2, 2006. Eight episodes were ordered. The show starred Nick, B.J., Aaron, Leslie and Angel Carter.

The show was parodied on Saturday Night Live on October 21, 2006, with Andy Samberg as Aaron Carter and Jason Sudeikis as Nick Carter.

Episodes

References

External links
 
 

2006 American television series debuts
2006 American television series endings
E! original programming
2000s American reality television series
English-language television shows
Nick Carter (musician)
Aaron Carter